Griselles is the name of two communes in France:
 Griselles, Côte-d'Or
 Griselles, Loiret